RCP may refer to:

Architecture 
 Reinforced concrete pipe
 Reflected ceiling plan

Computer technology 
 RCP (chip), a co-processor chip designed by Silicon Graphics for use in the Nintendo 64 gaming system
 rcp (Unix), a command on the Unix operating systems that is used to remote copy a file
 Rapid control prototyping, a process that lets engineers quickly test and iterate their control strategies
 Restore Cursor Position (ANSI), an ANSI X3.64 escape sequence
 Rich Client Platform, a software development platform helping software developers to rapidly build new applications
 Remote Control Protocol, a protocol that allows CEC enabled TVs to control MHL compatible devices

Medicine 
 Respiratory Care Practitioner
 Retrograde cholangiopancreatography
 Royal College of Physicians, located in London, Edinburgh, and Ireland

Organizations 
 Radio Club Paraguayo, an amateur radio organization in Paraguay
 Radio Club Peruano, an amateur radio organization in Peru
 Radio Corporation of the Philippines, the oldest radio network in the Philippines
 Rochester Community Players, a theatrical company in Rochester, NY

Businesses
 RCP Design Global, a French design agency
 RIT Capital Partners, a large UK investment trust

Political groups 
 Revolutionary Communist Party (disambiguation), the name of several revolutionary communist parties worldwide
 Romanian Communist Party
 Russian Communist Party, the second of four names used at different times by the Communist Party of the Soviet Union

Science 
 Reactor Coolant Pumps in International Reactor Innovative and Secure nuclear reactors
 Representative Concentration Pathways, scenarios of greenhouse gas trajectories
 Right circular polarization, in radio communications/radio astronomy
 Rapid crack propagation, in testing of plastic pipes
 Radiochemical purity, % radiodetected peak area of the intact radiolabeled peptide vs all radio peaks measured during the same analyses

Other uses
 Radio College Park, a Persian podcast
 Random close pack, packing method for objects
 RealClearPolitics, a political website
 Retention Control Point, high year tenure in the United States Army
 Rose City Park, Portland, Oregon, United States
 Royal Commonwealth Pool in Edinburgh, Scotland, UK